Rosa Bertha Oneto Martínez (born 27 August 1957), better known as Bettina Oneto, is a Peruvian actress, humorist, singer, stand-up comedian, and producer.

Biography
The daughter of comedian Carlos Oneto, Bettina Oneto debuted as a singer in a restaurant with a musical group in Toronto, Canada. She married Richard "Bimbo" Macedo (drummer of the rock group ), with whom she had her first daughter, . She also appeared on various other programs, such as La comedia Peruana and Volver a vivir.

In 1981 she debuted as a vedette in the revue Paro general at the café-théâtre La Gata Caliente. She then moved to New York, where she attended courses in singing, theater, and dance.

She returned to Peru, where she starred in the revue Los valatos del 85, under the direction of Efraín Aguilar, along with Analí Cabrera, Doris Caballero, and Rodolfo Carrión.

She participated in cafés-théâtres such as El Ático, Sachariel, Canout, Monarisa, La Mueca, and Pimpinela.

From 1985 to 1988 she worked in the Orchestra of Carlos Brescia.

Oneto performed at the Peruvian National Theater, in the play El pájaro azul, playing "The Night". She married footballer Carlos Lazon, with whom she had two children. Beginning in 1998 she appeared in theatrical works directed by Osvaldo Cattone – Con el sexo no se juega, Annie, Marido mas mujer igual desastre, Filumena Marturano, and The Vagina Monologues.

She appeared on the television comedy program , as well as Teatro desde el teatro.

In 1999 she was called on by the producers and directors of Jucare, and presented the play El espectáculo soy yo in Barranco Station. This was a success, running for three years and touring Japan and the United States. The following year she released an album with the recording of a live performance.

In 2006 she performed in the show ¿Hija de su Madre? In 2007 she starred in the drama Matrimonio a la peruana, and in 2008 she launched El espectáculo sigo siendo yo, compiling various performances from that year.

In 2011 she performed in the telenovela La bodeguita.

In 2012 she celebrated her 36-year artistic career with the show Viva la vida. She then briefly participated in the dance reality program El Gran Show.

Television credits
 Teatro como en el teatro (1978)
 La comedia Peruana
 Volver a vivir
  (1997–1999)
 Teatro desde el teatro (2002–2008)
 Noche de estrellas (2003)
 La bodeguita (2011–2012) as Rochi
 El gran show (2011) as guest judge
 El gran show (2012) as contestant
  (2013) as guest judge
  (2013–2014) as judge

References

External links
 
 
 

1957 births
20th-century Peruvian actresses
21st-century Peruvian actresses
Actresses from Lima
Living people
Peruvian comedians
Peruvian musical theatre actresses
Peruvian telenovela actresses
Peruvian vedettes
Singers from Lima
Stand-up comedians
Peruvian women comedians